Danville Airport  is a public use airport in Northumberland County, Pennsylvania, United States. It is located three nautical miles (6 km) southwest of the central business district of Danville, a borough in Montour County. The airport is owned by the Montour & Northumberland County Commissioners.

Facilities and aircraft 

It has one asphalt paved runway designated 9/27 which measures 3,000 by 60 feet (914 x 18 m).

For the 12-month period ending August 6, 2008, the airport had 30,000 general aviation aircraft operations, an average of 82 per day. At that time there were 38 aircraft based at this airport, all single-engine.

References

External links 

Airports in Pennsylvania
Transportation buildings and structures in Northumberland County, Pennsylvania
County government agencies in Pennsylvania